The Men's 5,000m T13 had its first round held on September 9, beginning at 9:10 and the Final on September 11 at 9:30.

Medalists

Results

References
Round 1 - Heat 1
Round 1 - Heat 2
Final

Athletics at the 2008 Summer Paralympics